
Year 351 BC was a year of the pre-Julian Roman calendar. At the time it was known as the Year of the Consulship of Peticus and Crispinus (or, less frequently, year 403 Ab urbe condita). The denomination 351 BC for this year has been used since the early medieval period, when the Anno Domini calendar era became the prevalent method in Europe for naming years.

Events 
 By place 

 Persian Empire 
 Encouraged by a failed effort at invasion of Egypt by King Artaxerxes III, Phoenicia and Cyprus revolt against Persia.

 Greece 
 Demosthenes tries to get the Athenians to cease depending on paid mercenaries and return to the old concept of a citizen army. He also delivers his First Philippic, warning Athenians of the folly of believing that Philip's ill health will save Athens from the Macedonians. In response, Athens' citizens vote for increased armaments.

 Roman Republic 
 The Etruscans are badly defeated by the Romans and abandon their attacks on the city and sue for peace.
 First use of the heavy throwing spear, the pilum, (according to Livy) in battle against the Gauls.
 Gaius Marcius Rutilus becomes the first Roman plebeian to be elected to the office of censor.

Births

Deaths

References